The 2008–09 Michigan Wolverines men's ice hockey team is the Wolverines' 87th season. They represent the University of Michigan in the 2008–09 NCAA Division I men's ice hockey season. The team is coached by Red Berenson and play their home games at Yost Ice Arena.

Season events

Regular season

Standings

Schedule and results
  Green background indicates shootout/overtime win (conference only) or win (2 points).
  Red background indicates regulation loss (0 points).
  White background indicates overtime/shootout loss (conference only) or tie (1 point).

Record is as follows:Win–loss–tie-SOW

Player stats

Skaters
Note: GP = Games played; G = Goals; A = Assists; Pts = Points; +/- = Plus/minus; PIM = Penalty minutes

Goaltenders
Note: GP = Games played; TOI = Time on ice; W = Wins; L = Losses; T = Ties; GA = Goals against; SO = Shutouts; SV% = Save percentage; GAA = Goals against average; G = Goals; A = Assists; PIM = Penalty minutes

See also
 2008 Michigan Wolverines football team
 2008–09 Michigan Wolverines men's basketball team

References

External links
 Michigan Wolverines men's ice hockey

Michigan
Michigan Wolverines men's ice hockey seasons
Mich
2008 in sports in Michigan
2009 in sports in Michigan